Lori Nichol is a Canadian figure skating choreographer and coach.  She was a performer for the John Curry Company from 1983 to 1986 and won the silver medal at the World Professional Championships in 1983. She is a four-time recipient of the Professional Skaters' Association's Choreographer of the Year Award  and the 2010 recipient of the PSA Sonia Henie award for bringing positive and favorable recognition to the sport. She was elected to the Professional Skater's Association Hall of Fame as an Outstanding Contributor in 2011, the United States Figure Skating Association's Hall of Fame as an Outstanding Contributor in 2012, and the Skate Canada Hall of Fame as an Outstanding Contributor in 2012. In March 2014, she was elected into the World Figure Skating Hall of Fame.

Choreographing career
Her most notable clients as a choreographer have included the following current and former students.

Mao Asada
Patrick Chan (she also coached him from 2010 to 2012)
 Nathan Chen
Sasha Cohen
Alissa Czisny
Gabrielle Daleman
Jessica Dubé & Bryce Davison
Rachael Flatt
Alexe Gilles
Timothy Goebel
 Gracie Gold
Chen Hongyi
Marin Honda
Jin Boyang
Yuma Kagiyama
Carolina Kostner
Michelle Kwan
Mira Leung
Beatrisa Liang
 Evan Lysacek
 Kimmie Meissner
Satoko Miyahara
Brandon Mroz
Mirai Nagasu
Alysa Liu
Nobunari Oda
Pang Qing & Tong Jian
Peng Cheng & Jin Yang
Joannie Rochette
Jamie Salé & David Pelletier
Shen Xue & Zhao Hongbo
Fumie Suguri
Sui Wenjing & Han Cong
Daisuke Takahashi
Tatiana Totmianina & Maxim Marinin
Denis Ten
Tomáš Verner
Yan Han
Yu Xiaoyu & Zhang Hao
Agnes Zawadzki
Caroline Zhang
Zhang Dan & Zhang Hao
Vincent Zhou
Andrei Rogozine

References

Canadian figure skating coaches
Figure skating choreographers
Living people
Year of birth missing (living people)
Place of birth missing (living people)
Female sports coaches